Tourlestrane is a Gaelic Athletic Association club based along the Sligo-Mayo border in south County Sligo, comprising the parish of the same name.

Notable players
Gerry McGowan – Connacht Senior Football Championship winner: 2007
Eamonn O'Hara – All Star: 2002

Honours
 Sligo Senior Football Championship: (17)
 1956, 1978, 1982, 1994, 1997, 1999, 2004, 2007, 2009, 2011, 2013, 2016, 2017, 2018, 2019, 2020, 2021, 2022
 Sligo Senior Hurling Championship: (7)
 1981, 1983, 1985, 1986, 1988, 1990, 1991
 Sligo Intermediate Football Championship: (1)
 1988
 Sligo Junior Football Championship: (5)
 1946, 1954, 1986, 2004, 2015, 2020 
 Sligo Under 20 Football Championship: (3)
 1976, 2006, 2008
 Sligo Minor Football Championship: (5)
 1967, 1968, 1971, 1981, 1982
 Sligo Under-16 Football Championship: (3)
 1971, 1975, 1977
 Sligo Senior Football League (Division 1): (16)
 1971, 1973, 1984, 1992, 2000, 2001, 2009, 2010, 2012, 2013, 2015, 2016, 2017, 2018, 2019, 2021
 Sligo Intermediate Football League (Division 4): (1)
 2009
 Sligo Junior Football League (Division 5): (1)
 1980
 Kiernan Cup: (3)
 1989, 1996, 2011
 Benson Cup: (2)
 1988, 2010

References

External links
Official club website

Gaelic games clubs in County Sligo